Scott Stone is an American politician and engineer who served as a Republican member of the North Carolina House of Representatives for the 105th from May 16, 2016 through the end of 2018.

Education
Stone graduated Clarkson University with a bachelor's degree in Civil and Environmental Engineering. He received a Master's in Business Administration (MBA) from Marymount University School of Business Administration.

Career
As member of the North Carolina House of Representatives, Stone represented House District 105 in the North Carolina General Assembly. Stone served the remainder of a term in 2016 after being appointed by Gov. Pat McCrory to fill a vacancy and served a full term during the 2017–2018 biennium session. He lost his re-election bid in 2018 to Wesley Harris.

In May 2020, during the COVID-19 pandemic, Stone attacked the Pottery Barn chain on Twitter for closing its store at a local mall two hours before the mall's closing time. After many critical replies, Stone deleted the tweet and took his account private.

Electoral history

2022

2020

2018

2016

2015

2011

References

External links
Official page at the North Carolina General Assembly
official campaign site

Living people
Year of birth missing (living people)
People from Charlotte, North Carolina
Politicians from Charlotte, North Carolina
Clarkson University alumni
Marymount University alumni
21st-century American politicians
Republican Party members of the North Carolina House of Representatives